The Frat Pack is a nickname given to a group of American comedy actors who have appeared together in many of the highest-grossing comedy films since the mid-1990s. The group is usually considered to include Ben Stiller, Owen Wilson, Luke Wilson, Will Ferrell, Steve Carell, Jack Black, Paul Rudd, and Vince Vaughn.

Origins
The term was used by USA Today in a June 2004 story and was soon picked up by other media outlets. Before USA Today dubbed this group the "Frat Pack", Entertainment Weekly had referred to them as the "Slacker Pack", having earlier coined the term "Frat Pack" to describe actors Leonardo DiCaprio, Tobey Maguire, Matt Damon, Ben Affleck, and Edward Norton, who have acted together in dramas. By 2005, Entertainment Weekly had dropped the "Slacker Pack" term and followed suit, referring to the aforementioned crop of actors as the "Frat Pack".

The name is an allusion to the Rat Pack (and the later Brat Pack), combined with a reference to the group's popular fraternity-related film Old School, and the sophomoric style of humor employed in many of their films. Ben Stiller has decried the use of the term, saying, "I think the whole thing about the Frat Pack group is completely fabricated anyway."

Membership 

Initially, the core members included Jack Black, Will Ferrell, Ben Stiller, Vince Vaughn, and brothers Owen Wilson and Luke Wilson, all of whom were recognized by USA Today in an early feature. Later, John C. Reilly, David Koechner, and Steve Carell were also included in the Pack. The previous year, USA Today had listed Carell, Paul Rudd, David Koechner, and Leslie Mann as the Frat Pack's "Junior Varsity". While hosting Saturday Night Live in September 2005, Carell indirectly claimed membership by mentioning Stiller, Vaughn, Ferrell, Owen Wilson, and Black, and saying he was "one of those guys now".

In 2005, Details Magazine called Judd Apatow, Adam McKay, and Todd Phillips "The Frat Packagers". A year later, Paul Rudd was called a Frat Pack member by the New York Post and other publications. Asked by an interviewer with The Advocate whether Knocked Up would usher him into the Frat Pack, Rudd said he was a "pledge" that hasn't "been initiated yet into the brotherhood".

Years later, in a 2011 interview, Rudd acknowledged his association with the group by saying, "As far as the Frat Pack concept goes, I'm happy to be included. I think the elder statesmen in it are really talented, and I'm a fan of all of them."  In a 2008 interview with Moviefone's Unscripted, Jack Black jokingly initiated Robert Downey Jr. into the Frat Pack, due to his starring role in Tropic Thunder with Black and Ben Stiller.

The members of the Frat Pack have worked regularly with certain directors. Wes Anderson is a college friend of the Wilsons and directed them in both Bottle Rocket and The Royal Tenenbaums (which also starred Stiller). Todd Phillips directed Old School and Starsky & Hutch. Adam McKay directed Anchorman: The Legend of Ron Burgundy, Talladega Nights: The Ballad of Ricky Bobby, and Step Brothers, which included John C. Reilly in a lead role.  Judd Apatow is the writer/producer of several Frat Pack comedies, including Anchorman: The Legend of Ron Burgundy. He made his directorial debut with The 40-Year-Old Virgin, starring Steve Carell, and followed up with Knocked Up, starring Seth Rogen and Paul Rudd, with a cameo by Carell. Apatow was also a co-creator of The Ben Stiller Show. Wedding Crashers director David Dobkin worked again with Vince Vaughn for the Christmas comedy Fred Claus (2007).

The Farrelly Brothers have directed Frat Pack members Ben Stiller in There's Something About Mary and The Heartbreak Kid, Jack Black in Shallow Hal and Owen Wilson in Hall Pass.

After The 40-Year-Old Virgin, there has been a consensus for branding a Team Apatow or the Apatow Mafia, which takes its name from the director/producer Judd Apatow.  This group of actors, consisting of Seth Rogen, Danny McBride, Jay Baruchel, Paul Rudd, Michael Cera, Jason Segel, Jonah Hill, James Franco, Craig Robinson, Joe Lo Truglio, Martin Starr, Bill Hader, Christopher Mintz-Plasse, David Krumholtz, and Evan Goldberg, in addition to appearing frequently in films of the Frat Pack, frequently collaborate with each other. Many fans also consider them as integral members of the Frat Pack.

Filmography 
Surprisingly and quite oddly, all eight members of the Frat Pack (or all six of the core members if one were to exclude Paul Rudd and Steve Carell) have never been featured in a single film together; Anchorman: The Legend of Ron Burgundy was the closest that they had ever come to this goal as of yet. Will Ferrell, Paul Rudd, and Steve Carell appeared in leading roles whereas Vince Vaughn appeared in a supporting role, Luke Wilson also appeared in a minor role whereas Jack Black and Ben Stiller had cameos. The only member of the Frat Pack to not appear in any way, shape or form is Owen Wilson; if he had appeared in the movie, then that means all members would have appeared within a single movie together.

Also, Will Ferrell, Ben Stiller, and frequent collaborator David Koechner have all been cast members on Saturday Night Live, and all members have hosted Saturday Night Live. Will Ferrell, David Koechner, and Jack Black have made guest appearances on The Office with Steve Carell.  They have also all presented during the Academy Awards. However, Owen Wilson and Steve Carell are the only members to be nominated for an Academy Award, with Wilson nominated for Best Original Screenplay for co-writing The Royal Tenenbaums and Carell nominated for Best Actor for his performance in Foxcatcher.

Also, just because a film/TV show etc. is considered to be synonymous with the Frat Pack, it doesn't innately mean it has to be comedic in nature, but should contain at least one comedic element, usually comic relief. For example, Permanent Midnight, despite being a drama rather than a comedy, is still a Frat Pack film due to the presences of Ben Stiller and Owen Wilson, and also because it involves the protagonist being a comedy writer.

See also
 Rat Pack
 Brit Pack
 Brat Pack
 Splat Pack
 Generation X
 American Eccentric Cinema

References

External links 
 Boys' Own Stories from Sight and Sound magazine, tracing the history of the Frat Pack
 Timeline of movies for Owen Wilson and Will Ferrell
 Timeline of movies for Will Ferrell and Ben Stiller

 
American male film actors
American film actresses
1990s in film
2000s in film
2010s in film
2020s in film
1990s in American cinema
2000s in American cinema
2010s in American cinema
2020s in American cinema
Groups of entertainers
Nicknames
Nicknames in film